Marin Glacier is a glacier just west of Cape Hickey, flowing southeast into Charcot Cove on the coast of Victoria Land. The glacier was mapped by the U.S. Geological Survey from ground surveys and Navy air photos and named by the Advisory Committee on Antarctic Names in 1964 for Bonifacio Marin, an engineman at McMurdo Station in 1962.

References

Glaciers of Victoria Land